The Social history of Canada is a branch of Canadian studies dealing with Social History, focusing on the history of ordinary people and their strategies of coping with life. It pays special attention to women, children, old age, workers, ethnic and racial groups and demographic patterns.  The field emerged in the 1960s and had a "golden age" in the 1970s. It continues as a major research field for historians. Social history is an umbrella approach that links to other approaches. For example, Hoerder (2005) argues that by employing the approaches and methods of social history, scholars can gain a better and more inclusive understanding of Canadian economic history. Among the subjects that would enrich such an understanding are family economies and the diversity of people's social lives. Additionally, a sociological approach would lead to a more comprehensive analysis of the state and its constituent parts.

New social history
The older social history (before 1960) included numerous topics that were not part of the mainstream historiography of political, military, diplomatic and constitutional history.  The "new social history" exploded on the scene in the 1960s, quickly becoming one of the dominant styles of historiography in the U.S., Britain and Canada.   After 1990 social history was increasingly challenged by cultural history, which emphasizes language and the importance of beliefs and assumptions and their causal role in group behavior.

Family history
Family history emerged as a separate field in the 1970s, with close ties to anthropology and sociology. The trend was especially pronounced in the U.S. and Canada. It emphasizes on demographic patterns, and public policy.  It is quite separate from Genealogy, though often drawing on the same primary sources such as censuses and family records.

Urban history

The "new urban history" emerged in the 1960s seeking to understand the "city as process" and, through quantitative methods, to learn more about the inarticulate masses in the cities, as opposed to the mayors and elites.  A major early study was Michael B. Katz,  The People of Hamilton, Canada West (1976)

Golden Age of Nova Scotia?
The work of the new social historians can be been in their study of social structure and its change over time. Several scholars have explored the so-called "golden age" of the Maritimes in the years just before Confederation. In Nova Scotia, the population grew steadily from 277,000 in 1851 to 388,000 in 1871, mostly from natural increase since immigration was slight. The era has been called a golden age, but that was a myth created in the 1930s to lure tourists to a romantic era of tall ships and antiques.  Recent historians using census data have shown that is a fallacy.  In 1851-1871 there was an overall increase in per capita wealth holding. However most of the gains went to the urban elite class, especially businessmen and financiers living in Halifax. The wealth held by the top 10% rose considerably over the two decades, but there was little improvement in the wealth levels in rural areas, which comprised the great majority of the population.  Likewise Gwyn reports that gentlemen, merchants, bankers, colliery owners, shipowners, shipbuilders, and master mariners flourished. However the great majority of families were headed by farmers, fishermen, craftsmen and laborers. Most of them-and many widows as well—lived in poverty. Out migration became an increasingly necessary option.  Thus the era was indeed a golden age but only for a small but powerful and highly visible elite.

See also

 Culture of Canada
 Demographics of Canada
 History of cities in Canada
 History of Canada
 Social history
 Who Killed Canadian History?

Notes

Further reading
 Bumsted, J.M. The Peoples of Canada (2 vol. 2003), textbook stressing social history
 Conrad, Margaret & Alvin Finkel & Cornelius Jaenen. History of the Canadian Peoples (2 vol. 1993), textbook stressing social history

Historiography
 Conrad, Margaret; Létourneau, Jocelyn; Northrup, David. "Canadians and Their Pasts: An Exploration in Historical Consciousness," Public Historian, February 2009, Vol. 31 Issue 1, pp 15–34
 Cross, Michael S. "Social History," Canadian Encyclopedia (2008) online
 Cross, Michael S., and Gregory S. Kealey, eds. Readings in Canadian Social History (5 vol., 1983), articles by scholars
 Darroch, Gordon. "The Relevance of Social  Science Standards of Data Base Availability for Social History," Histoire sociale / Social History, May 1994, Vol. 27 Issue 53, pp 147–156
 Hoerder, Dirk. "Towards a History  of Canadians: Transcultural Human Agency as Seen Through Economic Behaviour, Community Formation, and Societal Institutions," Histoire sociale / Social History, November 2005, Vol. 38 Issue 76, pp 433–459
 Horn, Michael and Sabourin, Ronald, eds. Studies in Canadian Social History (1974). 480 pp. articles by scholars

Workers
 Bradbury, Bettina. Working families: Age, gender, and daily survival in industrializing Montreal (1993)
 Craven, Paul, ed., Labouring lives: work and workers in nineteenth-century Ontario (1995)
 Frager, Ruth A.,  and Carmela K. Patrias. Discounted Labour: Women Workers in Canada, 1870-1939 (2005) excerpt and text search
 Hertel; D. W. History of the Brotherhood of Maintenance of Way Employees: Its Birth and Growth, 1887-1955. 1955 online edition 
 Morton, Desmond.  Working People: An Illustrated History of the Canadian Labour Movement (1999) excerpt and text search
 Palmer, Bryan D. Working Class Experience: Rethinking the History of Canadian Labour, 1800-1991, 1992

Women, gender, family
 Bradbury, Bettina. Working families: Age, gender, and daily survival in industrializing Montreal (1993)
 Cohen, Marjorie Griffin.  Women's Work, Markets, and Economic Development in Nineteenth-Century Ontario. (1988). 258 pp.
 Forestell, Nancy M., Kathryn M. McPherson, and Cecilia Louise Morgan, eds. Gendered Pasts: Historical Essays in Femininity and Masculinity in Canada. (2003) 370 pp.,  online review from H-CANADA
 Frager, Ruth A.,  and Carmela K. Patrias. Discounted Labour: Women Workers in Canada, 1870-1939 (2005) excerpt and text search
 Gleason, Mona,  and Adele Perry. Rethinking Canada: The Promise of Women's History. (5th ed. 2006) 407 pp.; 24 essays by scholars  online review from H-CANADA; also excerpt and text search
 Halpern, Monda.  And on that Farm He Had a Wife: Ontario Farm Women and Feminism, 1900-1970. (2001). 234 pp.  online review from H-CANADA
 Hammill, Faye.  Literary Culture and Female Authorship in Canada 1760-2000. Amsterdam: Rodopi, 2003. 245 pp.
 Kechnie, Margaret C.  Organizing Rural Women: the Federated Women's Institutes of Ontario, 1897-1910. (2003). 194 pp.
  Moss, Mark.  Manliness and Militarism: Educating Young Boys in Ontario for War. (2001). 216 pp.
 Noël, Françoise. Family Life and Sociability in Upper and Lower Canada, 1780-1870. (2003) 384pp
 Noël, Françoise. Family and Community Life in Northeastern Ontario: The Interwar Years (2009)
 Parr, Joy, ed.  A Diversity of Women: Ontario, 1945-1980. (1996). 335 pp.
  Prentice, Alison et al.. Canadian Women: a history (2nd ed. 1996)
 Smith, Judith E.  Visions of Belonging: Family Stories, Popular Culture, and Postwar Democracy, 1940-1960. (2004). 444 pp.
 Smith, Michelle J., Clare Bradford, et al. From Colonial to Modern: Transnational Girlhood in Canadian, Australian, and New Zealand Literature, 1840-1940 (2018) excerpt
 Strong-Boag, Veronica, Mona Gleason, and Adele Perry. Rethinking Canada: The Promise of Women's History (2003) excerpt and text search
 Van Kirk, Sylvia. Many Tender Ties: Women in Fur-Trade Society in Western Canada, 1670-1870. Winnipeg: Watson Swayer Publishing Ltd, (1980)

Ethnicity, religion, and population
 Bagnell, Kenneth. Canadese: A portrait of the Italian Canadians (1989)
 Bloemraad, Irene. Becoming a Citizen: Incorporating Immigrants and Refugees in the United States and Canada (2006) excerpt and text search
 Fay, Terence J. A History of Canadian Catholics. (2002). 392 pp., . online review from H-CANADA also excerpt and text search
 Friedland, Martin L. The University of Toronto: A History. (2002). 777pp  online review at H-CANADA
 Grekul, Lisa. Leaving Shadows: Literature in English by Canada's Ukrainians (2005)
   Grenke, Arthur. The German Community in Winnipeg 1872 to 1919 (1991)
 Hoerder, Dirk. Creating Societies: Immigrant Lives in Canada. (2000) 416 pp.
  Iacovetta, Franca, Paula Draper, and Robert A. Ventresca. A Nation of Immigrants: Readings in Canadian History, 1840s-1960s (1998)
 Kelley, Ninette,  and Michael J. Trebilcock. The Making of the Mosaic: A History of Canadian Immigration Policy (1998)
 Kukushkin, Vadim. From Peasants to Labourers: Ukrainian and Belarusan Immigration from the Russian Empire to Canada (2007)
 McDougall, Duncan M. "Immigration into Canada, 1851-1920," The Canadian Journal of Economics and Political Science, Vol. 27, No. 2 (May, 1961), pp. 162–175 in JSTOR
 McKay, Ian. "Tartanism Triumphant. The Construction of Scottishness in Nova Scotia, 1933-1954." Acadiensis 21, no. 2 (Spring 1992): 5-47.
 Magocsi, Paul R. ed. Encyclopedia of Canadas Peoples (1999), detailed guides to all groups
 Makabe, Tomoko. The Canadian Sansei (1998), 3rd generation of Japanese descent
  Marshall, David. Secularizing the Faith: Canadian Protestant Clergy and the Crisis of Belief, 1850-1940 (1992).
 Messamore, Barbara, ed. Canadian Migration Patterns from Britain and North America (2004) 300pp; essays by scholars
 Murphy, Terrence, and Roberto Perin, eds. A Concise History of Christianity in Canada (1996).
 Petryshyn, Jaroslav. Peasants in the Promised Land: Canada and the Ukrainians (1985)
 Pivato, Joseph. The Anthology Of Italian-Canadian Writing (1998)
 Riedel, Walter. The Old world and the new: Literary perspectives of German-speaking Canadians (1984)
 Roy, Patricia. A White Man's Province: British Columbia Politicians and Chinese and Japanese Immigrants, 1858-1914 (1989)
 Schryer, Frans J. The Netherlandic Presence in Ontario: Pillars, Class and Dutch Ethnicity. (1998). 458 pp. focus is post WW2
  Wagner, Jonathan. A History Of Migration From Germany to Canada, 1850-1939 (2005)